41 Combat Engineer Regiment (41 CER,) is an Army Reserve (militia) unit of the Canadian Military Engineers/Royal Canadian Engineers (RCE) in  Alberta, Canada.  The unit consists of:
 Regimental Headquarters (RHQ),
 25 Engineer Squadron (25 Engr Sqn) in Edmonton,
 33 Engineer Squadron (33 Engr Sqn) in Calgary, and
 Administration Squadron (Admin Sqn).

The unit parades on Wednesday evenings and Saturdays at the Lieutenant-Colonel Philip L. Debney Armoury in Edmonton and at the General Sir Arthur Currie Building in Calgary. 41 CER is allocated to 41 Canadian Brigade Group, which in turn is part of 3rd Canadian Division.

History
41 Combat Engineer Regiment was stood up on 6 September 2008 at a parade at the Military Museums in Calgary. The parade officially disbanded and amalgamated 8 Field Engineer Regiment and 33 Field Engineer Squadron. Amalgamation meant the resulting unit was entitled to the combined honours and history of the constituent units. This was authorized by Gordon O'Connor, then Minister of National Defence under Ministerial Organization Order 2006041 on 23 November 2006.

8 Field Engineer Regiment was the senior unit that was amalgamated and was created in 1947 as a result of a post-war reorganization of the militia engineers. At its peak the regiment controlled five sub-units: 
 13th Field Squadron in Calgary;
 17th Field Squadron in Kimberley, British Columbia;
 24th Field Squadron in Yellowknife, Northwest Territories;
 25th Field Squadron in Edmonton; and
 33rd Field Park Squadron in Lethbridge.

25 Engineer Squadron
25 Engineer Squadron traces its lineage to 9th Army Troops Company (Royal Canadian Engineers) which was formed in 1937 following a reorganization of the militia in Canada.  During the Second World War the company served as part of 1st Pioneer Battalion, later known as 1st Battalion Army Troops (Royal Canadian Engineers).  Through most of the war, they served as construction troops supporting First Canadian Army.  Following the war the army troops companies were no longer required and the sub-unit was re-designated 25th Field Squadron with the task of providing field engineer support to Edmonton-area units.

33 Engineer Squadron
33 Engineer Squadron traces its lineage back to 6th Field Park Squadron (6 Fd Pk Sqn) that was formed in Lethbridge in 1940. 6 Field Park Squadron was mobilized in early 1941 and formed part of the 4th Canadian Armoured Division.  Their task was supplying the field squadrons in the division, as well as all other units, with every kind of engineer material necessary. This included both military and local resources. A few of the items produced by 6 Field Park Squadron and delivered are 56,800 signs of all sizes and shapes, 16,300 barber poles or lane markers, 1,221 crosses, 4,000 drift pins and 8,000 timber dogs.  In addition thousands of tons of innumerable other stores were hauled from Corps dumps or requisitioned from civilians.

Their skilled workers had to operate many times under the most adverse of conditions. In March 1946, the sappers returned home to Lethbridge and the unit was re-designated to 33rd Field Park Squadron in 1947. In 1954 the squadron was re-roled to a field squadron and in 1968 was relocated to Calgary. In 1971, the unit was relocated to Edmonton and zero-manned in favour of keeping 25th Field Squadron fully operational. On 23 July 1990, after a decade of lobbying by the Calgary Branch of the Military Engineers Association of Canada, 33rd Field Engineer Squadron was reactivated and relocated to Calgary.  It achieved independent squadron status in 1991 and has provided combat engineering support to Calgary-area units for 18 years prior to amalgamating with 8 FER in 2008.

Training

As a reserve unit, 41 Combat Engineer Regiment continues to train in skills to support the Canadian Forces abroad and at home.  In recent years the regiment has conducted exercises in a variety of places, including.
 CFB Wainwright, Alberta
 Vegreville, Alberta
 Chilliwack, British Columbia
 Dundurn, Saskatchewan
 Drayton Valley, Alberta
 CFB Suffield, Alberta
 CFB Cold Lake, Alberta
 Outlook, Saskatchewan
 Hinton, Alberta
 Fort Lewis, Washington

Deployments
Personnel from the unit have deployed on United Nations and NATO peacekeeping missions including:
 Cyprus (UNFICYP, Operation Snowgoose),
 Croatia (UNPROFOR, Operation Harmony),
 Cambodia (UNTAC, Operation Marquis),
 Bosnia (SFOR, Operation Palladium),
 Afghanistan (Operations Athena and Archer).  As of the end of 2009 two men from the unit had been wounded and one, Sgt. George Miok was killed.

Personnel from 41 CER deployed for relief assistance in support of civilian authorities to the city of Calgary during the 2013 Alberta floods. 41 CER deployed under Task Force Silvertip in support of Operation Lentus. This was the first entirely reserve task force ever stood up by the Canadian military and encompassed all units in 41 Canadian Brigade Group.

Relationship with Town of Vegreville
41 Combat Engineer Regiment has fostered a relationship with the Town of Vegreville, Alberta, which is located  103 km east of Edmonton.  On 29 April 2006 the unit received the Freedom of the Town, becoming the only unit in the Canadian Forces to have this honour.

The unit started this relationship in large part due to their yearly participation of 25 Engineer Squadron in the Remembrance Day parade.  Eventually the unit received permission and blessings from the town to hold annual exercises within the town and the surrounding areas.

In 2007 the Regiment built a new bridge in the park containing the town's famous Pysanka (Ukrainian Easter Egg). This was completed the same week-end the unit received the Freedom of the Town. On 7 May 2008, during a change of command parade, the bridge was formally named the LCol Dan O'Keefe Bridge for the outgoing Commanding Officer. The Town Council had voted to do so in large part due to LCol O'Keefe's tremendous efforts at building a relationship with the Town.

Mascot

Due in large part to their natural construction abilities and their presence in the Canadian wilderness, the beaver has long been the symbol of military engineers in Canada.  The first cap-badge of the Canadian Engineers, that is the Militia component of the Engineers of the Canadian Army, had the beaver at its center.

The official mascot of 25 Engineer Squadron (formerly of 8 Field Engineer Regiment) is Sapper Bentley F. Beaver, a stuffed toy beaver who is dressed with a beret, dress uniform and identity discs.

Some members of the unit claim that Bentley is the most decorated beaver in the world.  This is because he has accompanied members of the unit for short periods of time while on tour, and therefore he would be eligible for the medals for his presence on the deployment.

This is a partial list of medals and decorations Sapper Beaver would be entitled to:
South-West Asia Service Medal
General Campaign Star with ISAF Bar
Canadian Peacekeeping Service Medal
United Nations Transitional Authority in Cambodia Medal
NATO Former Yugoslavia Medal
NATO Non-Article 5 Medal
125th Anniversary of the Confederation of Canada Medal
Queen Elizabeth II Golden Jubilee Medal
Queen Elizabeth II Diamond Jubilee Medal
Canadian Forces Decoration
Alberta Centennial Medal

See also

 Military history of Canada
 History of the Canadian Army
 Canadian Forces
 List of armouries in Canada

References

External links

Order of precedence

Engineer regiments of Canada
Military units and formations established in 2008